Yael Markovich (pronounced Ya-el, born 15 September in Haifa, Israel) is an Israeli-American model and Israeli beauty queen titleholder.

Early life 
Yael Markovich was born in Haifa, Israel. Yael is Jewish, attended a Jewish day school and had a Bat Mitzvah.

Career

Modeling 
Markovich has been featured on websites such as Maxim, Askmen, IGN, and Playboy's The Smoking Jacket. In addition, Markovich has graced the covers of Venus Says Magazine , the December 2012/January 2013 issue of Jewish Journal's sister publication Tribe Magazine,; cover of Israeli Week Newspaper the week of 6 February 2013 – 12 February 2013, the February 2013/March 2013 issue of 303 Magazine, a Denver, CO based fashion magazine, and the cover page of Israeli national newspaper Yediot Achronot (Ynet America). The Israeli Post also featured Miss Markovich in August 2013.

Pageants

Miss Supranational Israel 2011 
Yael was crowned Miss Supranational Israel 2011, and went on to represent her country in the 3rd annual Miss Supranational pageant held in Plock, Poland, on 26 August 2011. She holds the title for being the first Miss Supranational Israel.

Miss International Israel 2012 
Yael was crowned Miss International Israel 2012. After 7 years of absence, Israel made its debut at the Miss International 2012 pageant. Miss Markovich represented Israel in the 52nd Miss International pageant on 21 October 2012 in Okinawa, Japan.

Miss Grand International Israel 2013 
Yael was crowned Miss Grand International Israel 2013 and would have represented her country in the 1st annual Miss Grand International pageant on 19 November 2013 in Bangkok, Thailand. However, the modeling agency that represents Miss Markovich, withdrew her from the competition for lack of agreement between the organizers and the modeling agency. Even though she did not compete, she still holds the title for being the first Miss Grand International Israel.

Controversy 
On 26 March 2013 controversy was stirred when Miss Markovich published her negative experience with the Miss Supranational Organization and her visit to Poland, on a pageant website. The article made headlines in Israel and had attracted dozens of Israeli national media outlets, such as Ynet.co.il and Shavua Israeli (Israeli Week), that shared Miss Markovich's experience by publishing a more detailed interview in Hebrew. On 29 March 2013 Miss Supranational Organization rebutted, by posting on their Facebook page a response to the allegations.

Personal life 
She is of Syrian, Turkish, and Polish descent.

Miss Markovich owned a day spa in Beverly Hills, California. In November 2014, Yael announced on social media that she had 
sold her salon for an undisclosed price.  

Yael founded the Miss Israel Organization. The Miss Israel Organization holds the franchises for Miss International Israel and Miss Grand Israel.

She is currently a Registered Nurse.

References

External links 
 
 
 
 

1989 births
American female models
American people of Israeli descent
Israeli female models
Israeli Jews
Jewish female models
Living people
People from Haifa
Santa Monica College alumni
Miss International 2012 delegates
21st-century American women